Gustavo Beliz (born 7 January 1962) is an Argentinian politician and expert in global governance.

Beliz was born in Buenos Aires. He graduated at Law from University of Buenos Aires and then studied at London School of Economics.

He served during the presidency of Carlos Menem as Minister of Interior between 1992 and 1994, when he resigned over a disagreement with the president for the 1994 reform of the Argentine constitution and created his own party. He ran for Mayor of Buenos Aires in 1996 and the next year was elected to the new City Council.

He was elected National Senator representing Buenos Aires City but never take office in 2001. Later he was designated Minister of Justice during the presidency of Néstor Kirchner between 2003 and 2004. During his years at the Ministry of Justice, he promoted the impeachment of some members of the Supreme Court.

Biography

Aademic background 
Beliz is a graduate of the School of Law at the Universidad de Buenos Aires (1989) and pursued postgraduate studies at the London School of Economics (1994) after winning a British Council scholarship to research globalization and state reform.
 
FHe was a professor at the School of Information Science at Universidad Austral between 1995 and 2001, and a professor at the Master's in Organizational Communications and an associate researcher at the Institute of Advanced Business Studies between 2000 and 2001.
In 1987, he won a scholarship to Japan, as part of the cultural agreements signed by President Alfonsín and Prime Minister Nakasone. He was named one of the 10 Outstanding Young People of Argentina by the Junior Chamber of Buenos Aires in 1992. In 1999 Time magazine and CNN included him in their list of 50 Latin American Leaders for the Third Millennium.

Political career 

He was president of the President of the National Civil Service Institute (1989–1992), Civil Service Secretary, and Minister of the Interior during Carlos Menem's first term in office. After opposing the constitutional reform of 1994 and blowing the whistle on corruption in 1995, he resigned from his position, left the Justicialist Party and founded the New Leadership Party in 1996.
He won 247,500 votes (13.10%) in the 1996 elections for Head of Government of the City of Buenos Aires, and five members of his party became part of the Constituent Assembly.
He was elected as a representative for the Autonomous City of Buenos Aires in 1997 as part of the city's first legislature after becoming an autonomous administrative district, a position he took up as part of a bloc of 11 representatives from the New Leadership Party.
For the 2000 elections for the head of government of the Autonomous City of Buenos Aires, he formed an alliance with Action for the Republic, the party of former minister of the economy Domingo Felipe Cavallo, running as the candidate for deputy head of government for the Encounter for the City coalition, which came second in the election, winning more than 33% of the votes and seats for 20 of its legislators.
In 2001, he led the New Country Front coalition, which came second in the elections, and was elected to the Argentine Senate as a senator for the City of Buenos Aires, but was not able to take up the position due to a long-standing dispute with the candidate Alfredo Bravo, despite the Supreme Court of Argentina confirming Beliz's appointment.
In 2003, his party was part of the winning Front for Victory ticket, headed by Néstor Kirchner as its candidate for president and Daniel Scioli as the candidate for vice president.
On Monday October 7, 2019, former minister of justice Gustavo Beliz took part in an event alongside then-presidential candidate Alberto Fernández, who confirmed that Beliz would be part of his team several days later. The two had worked together during the Néstor Kirchner administration before resigning from office.

Minister of Justice, Citizen Security and Human Rights (2003-2004) 
Following Kirchner's victory in the 2003 presidential elections, Beliz became Minister of Justice, Citizen Security, and Human Rights and launched a campaign to promote transparency within Argentina's federal judiciary. He advocated for the impeachment of members of the Supreme Court who were suspected of corruption and instituted the method of self-limitation in the appointment of judges by the Office of the President through a system of challenges and public hearings, which allowed for greater transparency and citizen participation.
He resign from office after a confrontation with Jaime Stiuso.

Career at The Interamerican Development Bank (2005-2019) 
Between 2005 and 2013, he lived in Washington, DC, working at the Inter-American Development Bank. In 2013, he moved to Uruguay, to coordinate the Citizen Security regional cluster. Between 2014 and October 2019 he was director of the Institute for the Integration of Latin America and the Caribbean (INTAL) at the Inter-American Development Bank (IDB).

Secretary of Strategic Affair for the President (since December 2019) 

As Secretary of Strategic Affairs, he is a cabinet minister and is responsible for designing and implementing the foreign relations strategy for the Office of the President, working in partnership with Argentina's other ministries. 
 
His work also involves planning and evaluating strategic affairs, international and institutional public policies, and Argentina's financial relationships with multilateral organizations. He is governor for Argentina on the board of governors of the Inter-American Development Bank (IDB), the World Bank, CAF/Development Bank of Latin America, the Central American Bank for Economic Integration, and Fonplata.
He and his team play a part in designing and formulating President Fernández's international communications, creating deliverables for meetings and official international visits based on strategic analysis. He also coordinates the analysis, planning, monitoring, and continuous evaluation of matters that relate to Argentina's foreign policy and national security strategy. He has been tasked by the President to create the Economic and Social Council for the Development of Argentina to generate strategic consensus among various social players and the government ecosystem. He is currently working on innovations to make the tender process for public works more transparent, make better use of the knowledge produced by different government offices, and to improve the quality of bilateral and multilateral technical and financial development assistance and better assess the impact of this.

Publications 

 Argentina hacia el año 2000. Editorial Galerna, 1986.
 CGT, el otro poder. Editorial Sudamericana-Planeta, 1988.
 La Argentina ausente. Editorial Sudamericana, 1990.
 Vale la pena. Adiós a la vieja política. Editorial Sudamericana, 1993.
 Política social, la cuenta pendiente (compilador). Editorial Sudamericana, 1995.
 Buenos Aires vale la pena. Editorial Planeta, 1996.
 No Robarás ¿Es posible ganarle a la corrupción? (compilador). Editorial de Belgrano, 1997.
 Proyecto Ciudad. Fondo Editorial Nueva Dirigencia, 1999.
 La cultura profesional del periodismo argentino (coautor con Enrique Zuleta Puceiro). Universidad Austral, 1999.
 El otro modelo. Grupo Editor Latinoamericano, 2000.
Robotlution, BID, 2017.
Industy 4.0. Creating the future , BID 2018.
Planet Algorithm, BID, 2018.

References

Living people
1962 births
Politicians from Buenos Aires
Justicialist Party politicians
20th-century Argentine lawyers
Ministers of Justice of Argentina
Members of the Buenos Aires City Legislature
University of Buenos Aires alumni